Marie-Josèphe Bertrand, Joze 'r C'hoed in Breton (1886-1970), was a Breton singer of traditional songs.

References

1886 births
1970 deaths
Breton musicians
French singers